Dodji Airport  is an airport serving the town of Dodji in Senegal.

See also
Transport in Senegal

References

 OurAirports - Senegal
 Dodji
 Google Earth

Airports in Senegal